The list of ship launches in 1999 includes a chronological list of all ships launched in 1999.


References

1999
1999 in transport